Jack McKinney was a pseudonym used by American authors James Luceno and Brian Daley before the latter's death.

As well as adapting Robotech into novel form, they were also responsible for the Sentinels series which continued to expand the Robotech Universe. They also wrote the Black Hole Travel Agency series. Robotech: The End of the Circle (1990) is the final Robotech novel co-written by both before Brian Daley's death.)

Published works

External links
 Bibliography at SciFan
 Robotech Book (Spanish)

20th-century American novelists
American science fiction writers
Science fiction shared pseudonyms
Robotech
American male novelists
20th-century American male writers